Barbara Anne Adams (born August 18, 1962) is a Canadian politician, who was elected to the Nova Scotia House of Assembly in the 2017 provincial election. A member of the Progressive Conservative Association of Nova Scotia, she represents the electoral district of Eastern Passage. Adams is the PC critic for Community Services; and the Advisory Council on the Status of Women.

Early life and education
Adams graduated from Dartmouth High School in 1980 and then from Dalhousie University with a Bachelor of Science in Physical Therapy in 1984.

Career
Adams was a physiotherapist and owned and operated a chronic pain clinic in Cole Harbour.

On August 31, 2021, Adams was made the first Minister of Seniors and Long-term Care.

Electoral record

References

Dalhousie University alumni
Living people
Canadian physiotherapists
Progressive Conservative Association of Nova Scotia MLAs
Members of the Executive Council of Nova Scotia
Women MLAs in Nova Scotia
21st-century Canadian politicians
21st-century Canadian women politicians
1962 births